Royal Air Force Bircotes or more simply RAF Bircotes is a former Royal Air Force satellite airfield located within South Yorkshire, England. Although it was named after the town of Bircotes which is in Nottinghamshire.

History
RAF Bircotes was located next the No. 1 Group RAF, RAF Bomber Command HQ at RAF Bawtry, Bawtry Hall, Bawtry, England. The airfield consisted of a grass strip with a connecting perimeter track with T2, B1 and Bessonneau hangars plus other miscellaneous buildings.

The Airfield opened in late 1941 and was used by the Avro Ansons, Vickers Wellingtons, and Avro Manchesters from No. 25 Operational Training Unit RAF (OTU) at nearby RAF Finningley.

A variety of training units occupied the airfield including two operational Training units:
 Satellite for No. 18 OTU (March 1943 - November 1944)
 Satellite for No. 28 OTU (June - July 1944)
 Satellite for No. 82 OTU (August - October 1943)
 Satellite for No. 16 (Polish) Service Flying Training School RAF (February - August 1943)
 Sub site for No. 35 Maintenance Unit RAF (November 1944 - 1945)

The No. 1 Group Communication Flight RAF from RAF Bawtry were also present at Bircotes from April 1941. The unit had moved from RAF Hucknall and at Bircotes the unit was using Miles Masters, Airspeed Oxfords, Miles Martinets, Curtiss Tomahawks and Westland Lysanders.

Towards the end of the Second World War and afterwards a number of different units used the airfield such as No. 250 Maintenance Unit RAF (MU) which formed at the airfield while under the control of RAF Maintenance Command and No. 61 MU which absorbed No. 250 MU and used Bircotes as a sub site between 1944 and 1948.

Current use

The airfield is currently farmland after being decommissioned on 13 July 1948 with little of the perimeter track left.

References

Citations

Bibliography

External links
 Roy Calvert service record details
 An aerial view showing evidence of the layout of the former Airfield. The existing buildings are shown in the bottom left hand corner. Bawtry and Bawtry Hall are shown towards the east.

Royal Air Force stations in Yorkshire
Royal Air Force stations of World War II in the United Kingdom
Aviation in Doncaster
Military history of South Yorkshire